Sammy Turner (born Samuel Black, June 2, 1932, Paterson, New Jersey) is an American singer, who was popular at the end of the 1950s.

Career
He was born and grew up in Paterson, New Jersey, developing an early interest in singing and songwriting, and on the outbreak of the Korean War in 1950 he enlisted in the U.S. Air Force and saw active service as a paratrooper.

He was signed to Bigtop Records late in the 1950s, and his releases featured production from Jerry Leiber and Mike Stoller. He scored several hits on the Billboard Hot 100 in 1959 and 1960; the biggest were "Lavender Blue", a number-three chart record on the Billboard Hot 100, and originally a hit for Sammy Kaye in 1949, and "Always", a number-one hit for Vincent Lopez in 1926. Later in the 1960s Turner recorded for Motown Records.

Singles

References

1932 births
Living people
Musicians from Paterson, New Jersey
American male singers
Singers from New Jersey
20th-century African-American male singers
21st-century African-American people